Telestes fontinalis, the Spring pijor, is a species of ray-finned fish in the family Cyprinidae.
It is found only in Croatia.
Its natural habitats are intermittent rivers and inland karsts.
It is threatened by habitat loss.

References

Sources
 

Telestes
Freshwater fish of Europe
Fish described in 1972
Taxonomy articles created by Polbot